Psiloptera attenuata is a species of beetles in the family Buprestidae.

Description
Head and elytra are metallic green.

Distribution
This species can be found in Brazil and Argentina.

References

Buprestidae
Beetles described in 1793